The 1974 National Challenge Cup was the 61st edition of the United States Soccer Football Association's annual open soccer championship. Teams from the North American Soccer League declined to participate.  The Greek American AA of New York City defeated the Croatian SC of Chicago in the final game.  The match was held on June 2.

Bracket

References

Sources
Chicago Tribune
Los Angeles Times
New York Times
St.Louis Post-Dispatch
San Francisco Chronicle

External links

Full details 1974 U.S. Open Cup – TheCup.us

Lamar Hunt U.S. Open Cup
U.S. Open Cup